Fliess may refer to:

Places
Fließ, a town in Tyrol, Austria
Fliess Bay, a bay in Joinville island off the Palmer Peninsula of Antarctica
Tegeler Fließ, a creek or river in Brandenburg, Germany
Schweinitzer Fließ, a creek or river in Brandenburg, Germany
Sydower Fließ, a municipality in Brandenburg, Germany

People
André Fliess, German footballer
Robert Fliess, psychoanalyst, son of Wilhelm
Sue Fliess, American author
Wilhelm Fliess, German psychologist and friend of Sigmund Freud